Shileh Vasht (also Romanized as Shīleh Vasht; also known as Shīleh Vasht-e Soflá) is a village in Kuhestani-ye Talesh Rural District, in the Central District of Talesh County, Gilan Province, Iran. At the 2006 census, its population was 364, in 81 families.

References 

Populated places in Talesh County